Katelyn Vaha'akolo (born 18 April 2000) is a New Zealand professional rugby league footballer. She previously played for the Newcastle Knights in the NRL Women's Premiership.

Background
Born in New Zealand, Vaha'akolo is of Māori and Tongan descent. She is the younger sister of Freedom Vahaakolo who played for the Highlanders in Super Rugby.

Playing career

Early years
In 2020, Vaha'akolo played for the Te Atatu Roosters and Akarana Falcons. In November 2020, she represented the Kiwi Ferns. In April 2021, she played for the Moana Pasifika rugby union side in the Takiwhitu Tūturu rugby sevens competition. In December 2021, she signed with the Newcastle Knights to be a part of their inaugural NRLW squad.

2022
In February, Vaha'akolo played for the Māori All Stars against the Indigenous All Stars. In Round 1 of the delayed 2021 NRL Women's season, she made her NRLW debut for the Knights against the Parramatta Eels. She played in 5 matches for the Knights, scoring one try, before parting ways with the club at the end of the season.

In October, she was selected for the New Zealand squad at the delayed 2021 Women's Rugby League World Cup in England. It was announced in November that she would be joining the Blues Women for the 2023 Super Rugby Aupiki season.

References

External links
Newcastle Knights profile
NZRL profile

2000 births
New Zealand female rugby league players
New Zealand Māori rugby league players
New Zealand sportspeople of Tongan descent
New Zealand women's national rugby league team players
Newcastle Knights (NRLW) players
Rugby league wingers
Living people